Sally Carrera is a fictional character in Pixar's Cars franchise. Sally is a 2002 Porsche 911 Carerra, and the character is modeled after Dawn Welch, the proprietor of Rock Cafe in Oklahoma. Sally is the town attorney for Radiator Springs, having moved from California, where she was a successful lawyer. She is voiced by Bonnie Hunt.

Sally is the love interest of Piston Cup racer Lightning McQueen, who is sentenced to community service after traffic-related convictions. Sally tries to talk the judge into directing McQueen to repair Main Street. Sally also makes an appearance in Cars 3.

Background 
In the film, Sally owns the Cozy Cone Motel, a newly refurbished tourist court similar in design to a Wigwam Motel in Holbrook, Arizona but with each individual motel room constructed as an oversized traffic cone. She has cones all around her shop, inside and out; even the lamps, planters and alarm clocks follow the theme. Neon lighting at the Cozy Cone, one of the first historic restoration efforts in Radiator Springs, displays the "100% Refrigerated Air" slogan of Tucumcari's historic US 66 Blue Swallow Motel.

She once was a successful California lawyer but, unhappy, chose to leave the state to settle in the small U.S. Route 66 town.

Sally is a 2002 Porsche 911 Carrera on a slightly-shortened wheelbase and has a pinstripe tattoo on her back. Pixar had initially wanted a classic Porsche for the role, but were convinced by Bob Carlson at Porsche to make her the latest model. Pixar's animators, modelers and sound crews obtained access to real Porsche 911-series vehicles to meticulously create an animated Sally who looks, moves and responds in a similar manner to the original automobile.

According to director John Lasseter. "Sally is the one modern car in the town of Radiator Springs. She's beautiful. It's interesting that people mostly think of a Porsche as powerful and a guy's car, but the lines on a Porsche are so beautiful that it fits perfectly for the character of Sally."

Her character is modeled on Dawn Welch of the historic Rock Café on U.S. Route 66 in Oklahoma, an advocate of the promotion and restoration of Stroud, Oklahoma after the town had been both bypassed by the Turner Turnpike and heavily damaged by a 1999 F3 tornado. Welch had long traveled cross-country promoting Route 66 and rallying support for keeping it alive. Like Sally, Dawn Welch is a relative newcomer to U.S. Route 66, having left the travel industry to purchase the Rock Café in 1993 and list it on the National Register of Historic Places in 2001. Originally, Sally was going to be a Ford Mustang, but Pixar animators found that the large grill too closely resembled a mustache.

Character 
Sally is instrumental in convincing the local judge to direct McQueen to repair the town's Main Street, a section of the now-bypassed U.S. Route 66, as a community service obligation upon his conviction in traffic court. Sally often calls Lightning McQueen "Stickers", at first because of his fake headlights and later as a friendly nickname. Her desire that McQueen stay to assist in rebuilding the town places her at odds with Doc's intransigence that "I want him out of my courtroom. I want him out of our town!", motivated by his desire to break all ties with a racing community which once abandoned him.

Sally leads McQueen on a leisurely drive on picturesque but serpentine mountain roads through Tailfin Pass to the vacant Wheel Well Motel, an abandoned motor court and filling station near a scenic lookout point with a wide panoramic view of Ornament Valley, Radiator Springs and the entire surrounding region (including US 66 and I-40). Surrounding scenery strongly resembles Arizona landmarks such as Havasu Falls near Grand Canyon National Park or Monument Valley. She also appears to be able to speak Italian at least when she sometimes talks to Guido.

She explains the history of the town with a nostalgic flashback, describing the two-lane Route 66's busy heyday and the construction of the parallel but unconnected six-lane I-40; the fact that it would not connect with Radiator Springs was unknown to the excited locals, who were expecting a new influx of visitors. The disappearance of cars from Main Street on the new highway's completion is every bit as abrupt as that (described to the film's makers by Arizona business people Angel and Juan Delgadillo) when I-40 opened in Seligman on September 22, 1978. When Interstate 40 is completed, US 66, Radiator Springs and Ornament Valley are all seen to simultaneously vanish from road maps as all highway traffic on 66 disappears and local businesses close, their business names fading into the underlying brickwork.

Lamenting that "the town got bypassed just to save ten minutes of driving", she often wishes to have seen the community in its heyday. Her efforts are devoted to historic restoration and tireless promotion of "Radiator Springs, the glorious jewel strung on the necklace of Route 66, the mother road". The town has been without clients for years, even though there are no services on the new road. As the task of rebuilding is huge (the Rock Café, listed on the National Register of Historic Places in 2001, represented a $60,000 restoration effort) she needs to convince a long-demoralised local populace not only that the town can be fixed but also that "we're a town worth fixing" and that "someday, we'll find a way to get this place back on the map."

Her ultimate objective is to get the once busy and neon-lit 1950s main street rebuilt to its former historic glory and obtain much-needed publicity for the town to restore "Radiator Springs" to highway signage and "Historic Route 66" to standard printed road maps. Sally serves as a vehicle to deliver a message which individual small towns, historic preservationists, route 66 associations, chambers of commerce, route 66 businesspeople and various long-time fans of the mother road have tried to convey for many years since US 66 became a decommissioned highway in 1985, largely removing the route from maps.

After the big race is complete, McQueen and Sally rebuild and reopen the Wheel Well as a bed and breakfast, restoring the historic 1930s fuel pumps to its forecourt. (A third motel in the area, the long-abandoned "Glenn Rio Motel", is shown briefly but does not return as a motel. She also appears in Cars 3 and attended the race where McQueen had his crash.

Appearances

Cars (2006)

Cars 2 (2011)

Cars 3 (2017)

Mater and the Ghostlight

See also 
 Sally (short story)
 Mustang Sally (song)
 Susie the Little Blue Coupe
 Portia (Merchant of Venice)

References

External links 
 

Cars (franchise) characters
Fictional cars
Fictional gynoids
Fictional lawyers
Fictional hoteliers
U.S. Route 66
Film characters introduced in 2006
Female characters in film
Fictional racing drivers
Animated characters introduced in 2006